Zameczek may refer to the following places:
Zameczek, Łódź Voivodeship (central Poland)
Zameczek, Masovian Voivodeship (east-central Poland)
Zameczek, Olsztyn County in Warmian-Masurian Voivodeship (north Poland)
Zameczek, Pisz County in Warmian-Masurian Voivodeship (north Poland)